China Lake is an unincorporated community in Kern County, California. The place is on China Lake, a dry lake on the Naval Air Weapons Station China Lake.

The first post office at China Lake opened in 1948.

History

Prehistory
The locale was originally settled by the Coso People, who were prolific artisans in creating rock art. The Coso left archaeological evidence substantiating trade between the Coso and other Native American tribes. For example, distant trade with the Chumash People is confirmed by archaeological recovery of obsidian that has been linked to the Cosos and was discovered as far away as coastal California prehistoric sites in San Luis Obispo County.

Early 1900s (origin of name)
Chinese prospectors harvested borax from the dry lake bed approximately 1.5 miles south of Paxton Ranch. The operation was known locally as "The Little Chinese Borax Works". This led to the area being called China Lake.

Climate
The area around China Lake has a hot desert climate (BWh) typical of the Mojave Desert with very hot, dry summers and cool winters. Most rain falls in the winter.

References

Populated places in the Mojave Desert
Unincorporated communities in Kern County, California
Ridgecrest, California
Unincorporated communities in California